Sean Scanlan (18 August 1948 – 17 April 2017) was a Scottish actor. He is known primarily for his many television and stage roles.

Career
Scanlan appeared in a large number of plays and television programmes, including as Dougie the ship's mate in The Tales of Para Handy and Shug in Rab C. Nesbitt.

He had a major role in Two Thousand Acres of Sky, playing Gordon Macphee, the ferryboat captain. Smaller parts include playing Kenneth McIver, the unlucky criminal brother of regular cast member TV John McIver in Hamish Macbeth. He also played the part of Duncan 'Jock' Mcevoy in Yorkshire TV's 1982 production of Airline alongside Roy Marsden and Richard Heffer.

In 2011, he performed in Sins of the Father while rehearsing Lark, Clark and the Puppet Handy.

Personal life
Born in Glasgow, Scotland, he was married to Barbara Rafferty, whom he met while performing Playing for Real.

Sean Scanlan died on 17 April 2017, aged 68.

References

External links
 

1948 births
2017 deaths
Scottish male stage actors
Scottish male television actors
Male actors from Glasgow
Scottish people of Irish descent
20th-century Scottish male actors
21st-century Scottish male actors